Lutfun Nahar Lata or Lota ( Lata Nasiruddin) is a Bangladeshi actress and director, known for Ei Shob Din Ratri (1985), Eka Eka (1985), and Bohubrihi (1988). She started her acting career in the late 1980s, and after she took a long break from acting in 1997.

Biography
She was born in Bangladesh. In 1997 she moved to New York City, and lives there. After the separation with Major Nasir Uddin she married Marc Weinberg, a Swiss American businessman in 2014. In 2017, she published a story book named Jibon O Juddher College. She was president of United States Bangabandhu Sangskritik Jote. She serves in the New York City Department of Education.

Works

Filmography
As actress

Films
 Ekattorer Lash (1998)

Television

As director
 Tumi Ashbe Bole (2016)

Books
 Jibon O Juddher College (2017)

References

External links
 

Living people
Bangladeshi film actresses
Bangladeshi stage actresses
Bangladeshi television actresses
Year of birth missing (living people)